Trinidad and Tobago participated at the 2018 Summer Youth Olympics in Buenos Aires, Argentina from 6 October to 18 October 2018.

Athletics

Futsal

Swimming

References

2018 in Trinidad and Tobago sport
Nations at the 2018 Summer Youth Olympics
Trinidad and Tobago at the Youth Olympics